Luana Theodoro da Silva (born 11 February 2003), known as Luaninha or simply Luana, is a Brazilian footballer who plays as a midfielder for Cruzeiro.

Club career
Born in Bauru, São Paulo, Luana joined Santos' youth setup in 2018, from Ferroviária. She made her first team debut on 26 August 2020, coming on as a second-half substitute for Erikinha and scoring his team's fifth in a 5–0 home routing of Audax.

On 23 January 2021, Luana signed her first professional contract with Santos. She left the club on 24 December, after failing to agree new terms.

In January 2022, Luaninha moved abroad and signed for Portuguese side Famalicão.

Honours
Santos
Copa Paulista de Futebol Feminino: 2020

References

2003 births
Living people
People from Bauru
Brazilian women's footballers
Women's association football midfielders
Campeonato Brasileiro de Futebol Feminino Série A1 players
Santos FC (women) players
F.C. Famalicão (women) players
Brazilian expatriate women's footballers
Brazilian expatriate sportspeople in Portugal
Expatriate women's footballers in Portugal
Footballers from São Paulo (state)